This is a list of 631 species in the genus Tychius.

Tychius species

References